Hershey is a surname, masculine given name and nickname. Notable people with the name include:

Surname
 Alfred Hershey (1908–1997), American Nobel Prize-winning bacteriologist and geneticist
 Almira Hershey (1843–1930), American hotel proprietor and property developer, daughter of Benjamin Hershey
 Amos Shartle Hershey (1867–1933), American professor of political science
 Arthur D. Hershey (born 1937), American politician
 Barbara Hershey (born 1948), American actress
 Benjamin Hershey (1813–1893), American lumber and farming magnate
 Frank Hershey (1907–1997), American automobile designer 
 Harry B. Hershey (1885-1967), American jurist and politician, Illinois Supreme Court justice
 Laura Ann Hershey (1962–2010), American poet, journalist, speaker, feminist and disability rights activist and consultant
 Lewis Blaine Hershey (1893–1977), US Army general
 Milton S. Hershey (1857–1945), American confectioner and philanthropist, founder of the Hershey Company
 Sara Hershey-Eddy (1837–1911), née Sarah Hershey, American musician, pianist, contralto vocalist, vocal instructor, musical educator and founder of the Hershey School of Musical Art
 Stephen S. Hershey Jr. (born 1964), Maryland State Senator
 Therese Tartlon Hershey (1923–2017), American conservationist and environmentalist
 Zeola Hershey Misener, suffragist and one of the first women elected to the Indiana General Assembly

Given name
 Hershey Felder, (born 1968), pianist, actor, playwright, composer and producer
 Hershey Friedman (born 1950), Canadian businessman and philanthropist
 Hershey Strosberg, American retired soccer coach

Nickname
 Hiroshi H. Miyamura (1925–2022), US Army soldier and Medal of Honor recipient
 Bill Nershi (born 1961), a founding member and acoustic guitarist for the American band The String Cheese Incident

Masculine given names
Lists of people by nickname